Vignola is a municipality in Emilia–Romagna, Italy.

Vignola may also refer to:

 Vignola (surname), Italian surname

Places
 Vignola-Falesina, a municipality in Trentino, Italy
 Trinità d'Agultu e Vignola, a municipality in Sardinia, Italy

Other
 Cassa di Risparmio di Vignola, an Italian savings bank also known as the Vignola Foundation
 Milano–Vignola, a professional road bicycle race

See also
 Vignol
 Vignole
 Vignoles (disambiguation)
 Vignolles
 Vignols